Boreum may refer to :
 Bo-reum, a feminine Korean given name
 Daeboreum, a Korean holiday and festival occasion
 Boreum, meaning 15 days in Korea
 Boreum, Cyrenaica, an Ancient city and bishopric in Roman Libya, now a Catholic titular see
 Planum Boreum, the northern polar plain on Mars